Hampton Hill (initially known as "New Hampton") is a district in the London Borough of Richmond upon Thames to the south of Twickenham, bounded by Fulwell and Twickenham Golf Courses to the northwest; the road bridge over the railway line; a line southward just east of Wellington Road; Bushy Park to the southeast; and the artificial Longford River to the south and west. Situated close to the Surrey county border, it is served by Fulwell railway station and Hampton railway station on the Shepperton to Waterloo line. It is part of what is collectively known as The Hamptons. Much of Hampton Hill High Street, and some neighbouring residential areas are designated as a conservation area.

History

Hampton Hill's urban development was railway-fuelled building in an area that was since the Middle Ages the north of Hampton ecclesiastical parish further away from the River Thames.  Distinguished from Hampton on all street name signs, it is that part across the Charles I-commissioned Longford River, an artificial watercourse built to supply Hampton Court, which forms the boundary between Hampton Hill and Hampton.

Its lack of development is reflected by the fact only seven of this complete list of listed buildings are actually buildings:
167 High Street
127 Uxbridge Road
Templeton Lodge
Brick Boundary Walls to Bushy Park
Stables & Garden Wall to Upper Lodge
Church of St James
Hampton Hill War Memorial (in St James' churchyard)
Monument At south-eastern end of General Roy's Survey Base
Upper Lodge
Old Brew House, Bushy Park
Bushy Park – a Grade I listed park

The oldest of the listed structures lie within the part of Bushy Park in the area; the Old Brew House may be late 17th century.

In the First World War, No 15 High Street was the drill hall of the 8th Battalion of the Middlesex Regiment. The regiment's insignia can still be seen in stone over the door.

Hampton Hill was bombed a number of times during the Blitz. The first major incident was in November 1940 when 63 Park Road was gutted when an abandoned Wellington bomber crashed on it. On the next night much of Alpha Road was destroyed and five people died after a Luftwaffe bomber dropped a landmine on it. Subsequently, Hampton Hill had a number of lucky escapes with bombs and incendiaries either failing to explode or landing in Bushy Park, Fulwell Golf Course, and other open land, with the next major incident being in June 1944 when a doodlebug exploded near Longford Close and killed one person.

Geography
The small town is in the southwestern suburbs of London, in the London Borough of Richmond upon Thames.  The geology of south-west London north of the river is a flat alluvial plain rich in clay and humus and thus useful for market gardening; with little floodplain on either side of the river and though downhill, Hampton's riverside is only  beneath the maximum elevation in Hampton Hill.  A comparison can be made with Strawberry Hill which is smaller and has a small noticeable incline to the east.

Aside from the residential areas of the town, the High Street is filled with shops, restaurants, several cafes, a few public houses, and a traditional 75-year-old bakery. The High Street also stages a yearly parade before Christmas when the street is closed and a procession takes place.

The Hampton Hill Association (HHA) launched its Hampton Hill Community website in 2007, with local links and telephone numbers, a What's On Guide, Gallery, History and Young Residents pages as well as information about the mission of the HHA and its committee members.

The High Street in Hampton Hill has an active traders' association. They have been organising the annual Christmas Lighting Up parade for over 40 years.  In 2010 the inaugural Hampton Hill Summer Festival was organised. The Hampton Hill Traders' Association together with Richmond Council co-fund the town centre manager, Jayne Jackson. The wide range of commerce, theatre and restaurants in the High Street is documented by an annually updated Hampton Hill Guide.

Hampton Hill is also home to the Hampton Hill Theatre, a small community theatre.

Transport

Bus services
 285 (Kingston to Heathrow Central via Teddington and Feltham): 24-hour service
 R68 (Kew Retail Park to Hampton Court via Richmond and Teddington)
 R70 (Hampton Nurserylands to Richmond 'Circular Service' via Twickenham)

Trains
 Fulwell railway station: Trains run every 30 minutes Mon-Sat
 Hampton railway station: Trains run every 30 minutes Mon-Sat
 Teddington railway station: Trains run approximately every 15 minutes Mon-Sat
Additional train services run during the weekday morning and evening peak

Education

Hampton Hill Junior School is on St James Avenue. Lady Eleanor Holles School Juniors Department is located in Hampton Hill, off Uxbridge Road (the Seniors are in Hampton, off Hanworth Road).

Churches
St James' Church, Hampton Hill – Church of England, built in 1863
Hampton Hill United Reformed Church
Hampton Hill Spiritualist Church
St Francis de Sales – Roman Catholic

Sports
Hampton Hill Cricket Club
Fulwell Golf Course
Strawberry Hill Golf Course
Twickenham Golf Course

References

External links
The Hampton Hill Guide with the Hampton Hill Traders' Association
Notes on Hampton Hill (Twickenham museum)
Hampton Hill Association community website
Burials in St James's churchyard
1st Hampton Hill Sea Scout Group
3rd Hampton Hill Scout Group

Areas of London
Districts of the London Borough of Richmond upon Thames